Kuhak may refer to:
 Kuhak, Bushehr
 Kuhak, Fars
 Kuhak-e Do, Fars Province
 Kuhak, Isfahan
 Kuhak, Qazvin
 Kuhak, Zanjan
 Kuhak Rural District, in Fars Province
 Kuhak, Sistan and Baluchestan
 Kuhak (film), a 1960 Bengali film